
Year 563 (DLXIII) was a common year starting on Monday (link will display the full calendar) of the Julian calendar. The denomination 563 for this year has been used since the early medieval period, when the Anno Domini calendar era became the prevalent method in Europe for naming years.

Events 
 By place 

 Byzantine Empire 
 Emperor Justinian I pardons Belisarius; he orders his release from prison, and  restores his properties and honours. He permits the general to live in obscurity, and gives him a veterans' pension.
 The new Hagia Sophia (cost: 20,000 pounds of gold), with its numerous chapels and shrines, octagonal dome and mosaics, becomes the centre and most visible monument of Eastern Orthodoxy.

 Europe 
 Tauredunum event: A mountain landslide into the Rhone river destroys a fort and two villages, and creates a tsunami in Lake Geneva. The wave which reaches Lausanne is thirteen metres high, and eight metres high by the time it hits Geneva. Describing the event, Marius Aventicensis writes that the tsunami "devastated very old villages with their men and cattle, it even destroyed many sacred places", and swept away "the bridge in Geneva, windmills and men".

 By topic 

 Religion 
 Columba, Irish missionary monk, travels to Scotland with twelve companions. He lands on the Kintyre Peninsula, near Southend, and begins his evangelising mission to the Picts. On the island of Iona, he founds a monastery (Iona Abbey) on the west coast in the Inner Hebrides.

Births 
 Andreas of Caesarea, bishop and writer (d. 637)
 Chindasuinth, king of the Visigoths (d. 653)

Deaths 
 January –Cutzinas, Berber chieftain
 Hou Andu, general of the Chen Dynasty (b. 520)
 Wang, empress of the Liang Dynasty

References